Hohenzollern Canal, or Hohenzollernkanal, may refer to:

 Berlin-Spandau Ship Canal, built between 1848 and 1859
 Oder–Havel Canal, built between 1908 and 1914